A sortie is a brief excursion of a military unit.

Sortie may also refer to:

Lunar sortie
Campaign sortie, a brief public event usually referred to as an election campaign rally
Soldiers Sortie, a Chinese TV drama
Sortie (album), a 1966 album by saxophonist Steve Lacy